Tuanku Syed Faizuddin Putra ibni Tuanku Syed Sirajuddin Jamalullail (born  in Alor Setar, Kedah, Malaysia) is the Raja Muda (Crown Prince) of the Malaysian state of Perlis. He is the only son and eldest child of the current Raja of Perlis, Tuanku Syed Sirajuddin.

Biography
Tuanku Syed Faizuddin Putra was born on 30 December 1967 at Sultanah Bahiyah Hospital in Alor Setar, Kedah. He is the eldest son of Tuanku Syed Sirajuddin Jamalullail and Tuanku Tengku Fauziah Tengku Abdul Rashid. 

He attended SRK Putra (Primary, Standards 1–6) and SMK Derma (Secondary, Forms 1–3) in Kangar before moving to Penang Free School in Georgetown, Penang (Secondary, Form 4) and later he attended Carey Grammar School in Melbourne, Australia (Secondary, Forms 5–6). 

He obtained his Bachelor of Economics B.Ec. from La Trobe University in Bundoora, Melbourne, Australia in 1989.

In 1990, Tuanku Syed Faizuddin Putra joined Malaysia Airlines in Kuala Lumpur as a Management Trainee and being given exposures at the General Management department, Flight Control Centre (FCC), MAS Hotels and Boutiques (MHB) as well as Passenger Sales Department. 
From 1992 to 1995, he was International Sales and Marketing Executive for Australasia, Europe, Middle-East (AEME) and Indian Sub-Continent before moving to the International Sales and Marketing Executive for Asia and Africa Region. Both positions being based at the head office in Jalan Sultan Ismail MAS Building. 

He became Area Manager for Spain, Portugal and Northern Africa based in Madrid from 1995 to 1997 and later Area Manager for Switzerland, Austria and Central Europe based in Zurich from 1997 to 2002. He was installed as the Raja Muda (Crown Prince) of Perlis at Istana Arau on 12 October 2000. During his father's tenure as the 12th Yang di-Pertuan Agong from December 2001 to December 2006, he served as the Regent of Perlis.

Tuanku Syed Faizuddin Putra has taken an active role in championing Malay and Muslim issues. He is the President of the Perlis Islamic Religious and Malay Customs Council (MAIPs).

Tuanku Syed Faizuddin Putra is also the Chancellor of Universiti Malaysia Perlis (UniMAP), Commander of 504th Regiment of The Malaysian Territorial Army / (Askar Wataniah - Reservist) (holding the rank of Brigadier General) and the Chairman of the Perlis Tuanku Syed Putra Foundation (YTSP). He is also the President of Putra Golf Club (KGP) in Perlis. On 14 April 2015, he was proclaimed as the first Chancellor of Kolej Universiti Islam Perlis (KUIPs).

Hobbies 
 He travels extensively around the world.
 He is an avid sportsman and still plays association football, cycling and woodball regularly. 
 He is also The Patron of The Malaysian Manchester United Football Club Supporters Club (MUFC SC). The last match he was present at Old Trafford was Manchester United vs Norwich City (League Cup 2013/4).

Marriage and children
Tuanku Syed Faizuddin Putra married Tuanku Lailatul Shahreen Akashah on 9 May 1994 in Kuala Lumpur. When he was appointed Raja Muda, she became the Raja Puan Muda (Crown Princess). The couple has three children:
Sharifah Khatreena Nuraniah (born  at the Pantai Hospital in Kuala Lumpur).
Sharifah Farah Adriana (born  at Zollikerberg Hospital, Zurich, Switzerland).
Syed Sirajuddin Areeb Putra (born  at Tuanku Fauziah Hospital (HTF), Kangar).

Honours 
  Knight Grand Commander of the Order of the Crown of Perlis (SPMP) (17 May 1998).
  Recipient of the Perlis Family Order of the Gallant Prince Syed Putra Jamalullail (DK) (12 December 2001)
His wife, Lailatul Shahreen Akashah, has been awarded :
  Knight Grand Commander of the Order of the Crown of Perlis (SPMP) (17 May 2002)

Other awards/honours received:

 P.A.T. From SPB YDP Agong Sultan Mizan Zainal Abidin (2010).
 Royal Malaysian Police (PDRM) Honorary insignia for Sniper and Bomb Specialist squad (2012).
 Royal Malaysian police (PDRM) Honorary Special Unit Force Para Wing (2010).
 Malaysian Scouts Royal Award (2009).
 Honorary insignia Wing from the Malaysian Army 8th Brigade Maroon Beret Paratrooper (2004).

From abroad

 Honoris Causa, Doctor in Education. La Trobe University, Melbourne, Australia. (2010).
 Distinguished Alumni, La Trobe University, Melbourne, Australia.
 Honorary Wing of The Special Warfare Command of The Royal Thai Army Paratrooper (2010).

Ancestry

References

1967 births
Living people
People from Kedah
Malaysian people of Malay descent
Malaysian Muslims
House of Jamalullail of Perlis
Heirs apparent
Royal House of Kelantan
Royal House of Terengganu
Sons of monarchs